Cerynea trogobasis is a species of moth of the family Erebidae first described by George Hampson in 1910. It is found in Queensland in Australia and the Kai Islands of Indonesia.

The wingspan is about 20 mm. Adults are pale brown, with pale broken zigzag lines outlined in dark grey across each forewing. There is a dark comma-shaped mark on the thorax and two black spots near the centre of each forewing.

References

Moths described in 1910
Boletobiinae